Vicky Rumeon (born 23 June 1962) is a Dutch taekwondo practitioner. He competed in the men's finweight at the 1988 Summer Olympics.

References

External links
 

1968 births
Place of birth unknown
Living people
Dutch male taekwondo practitioners
Olympic taekwondo practitioners of the Netherlands
Taekwondo practitioners at the 1988 Summer Olympics
20th-century Dutch people
21st-century Dutch people